John Walker (born 12 December 1973) is a Scottish former professional footballer, who played as a midfielder. He notably played for Clydebank and Mansfield Town in a career that lasted between 1990 and 2004.

Walker started his professional career with Rangers but in three years at Ibrox he only managed three first team appearances. In 1993, he transferred to Clydebank. He then made a move to England in 1995, signing with Grimsby Town. He was brought Blundell Park by Brian Laws as the club's highest paid player; after three years he then joined Mansfield Town following a loan spell at the club.

After spending time on trial with Scarborough and Kingstonian, he returned to Scotland in March 2000 to play out his career for Greenock Morton, Clydebank and Hamilton Academical. While playing for Hamilton in March 2003, he failed a random drugs test and was subsequently banned from football for three months.

References

1973 births
Footballers from Glasgow
Association football midfielders
Scottish footballers
Boston United F.C. players
Clydebank F.C. (1965) players
Greenock Morton F.C. players
Grimsby Town F.C. players
Hamilton Academical F.C. players
Kingstonian F.C. players
Living people
Mansfield Town F.C. players
Rangers F.C. players
Scottish Football League players
English Football League players
Doping cases in association football
Scottish sportspeople in doping cases